Aaron Hawkins may refer to:

 Aaron Hawkins (engineer) (born 1970), American engineer
 Aaron Hawkins (politician) (born 1983/1984),  mayor of Dunedin City in Otago, New Zealand